Outlaw Gentlemen & Shady Ladies is the fifth studio album by Danish rock band Volbeat. The album was released on 5 April 2013. The title refers to the outlaws and gunslingers of the 19th century. This is the band's first album with guitarist Rob Caggiano and their final album with bassist Anders Kjølholm. The track "Room 24", with vocalist King Diamond, was made available for the fans as a free download on 5 April 2013, and was later nominated for the Grammy Award for Best Metal Performance.

Background
In January 2013, Volbeat revealed that they had been working on a new album which was named Outlaw Gentlemen & Shady Ladies and that it was set for a spring 2013 release

It was later announced that the former Anthrax lead guitarist, Rob Caggiano, would be producing the album as well as recording guest solos. Shortly thereafter, it was announced that Caggiano had officially joined the band as its second guitarist, after being asked to do so by the other band members. Singer and guitarist Michael Poulsen said of the chemistry between Caggiano and the rest of the band, "The collaboration with Rob in the studio was so inspiring and in good spirit that we the decided to keep him. Basically we went into the studio as a three piece and came out as a whole band!"  At the same time, it was announced that the album would be released on April 8, 2013 (GSA on April 5 and USA on April 9).

In an interview on February 11, 2013, Poulsen told Metal Hammer magazine, "One of the things I’m most happy about this time is the contrast in the material, the range of the music; on the one side, you have the western motifs, the rockabilly / country songs, and the real emotional melodies, and on the other, some of the heaviest – actually, THE heaviest – songs we have ever recorded. There was a record company guy in the studio the other day, and he was absolutely blown away by the ultra-heavy stuff. He said he wasn’t even sure he was listening to Volbeat!".

Commercial performance
The album entered the Billboard 200 in the United States at number nine. The album sold 39,000 in its first week. It is the first time a Danish act has charted in the top 10 of the Billboard 200 since Aquarium by Aqua charted at number seven in 1997. As of April 2016, Outlaw Gentlemen & Shady Ladies had sold 308,000 copies in the US.

The album entered the Media Control Charts in Germany at number one and received immediate gold status. The album sold  more than 100,000 in its first week.

In the United Kingdom, Outlaw Gentlemen & Shady Ladies debuted at number 78 in the UK Albums Chart, selling 1,276 copies in its first week. As of June 2016, the album had sold 18,671 copies in the UK.

Track listing

Tour Edition

Personnel
Volbeat
 Michael Poulsen – vocals, rhythm guitar
 Anders Kjølholm – bass
 Jon Larsen – drums
 Rob Caggiano – lead guitar

Guest musicians
 King Diamond – vocals on "Room 24"
 Paul Lamb – harp on tracks 1, 14 and 16
 Sarah Blackwood – vocals on "Lonesome Rider"
 Anders Pedersen – slide guitar on tracks 7, 10 and 11 
 Jakob Øelund – double bass
 Rod Sinclair – banjo

Charts

Weekly charts

Year-end charts

Certifications

References

External links

2013 albums
Vertigo Records albums
Volbeat albums
Albums produced by Jacob Hansen